Otto Frommknecht (1881 – 1969) is a German politician. He was a representative of the Christian Social Union of Bavaria and from 1919 to 1933 was a member of the Bavarian People's Party.

He was a state minister for Verkehr.

See also
List of Bavarian Christian Social Union politicians

Ministers of the Bavaria State Government
Christian Social Union in Bavaria politicians
1881 births
1969 deaths
Knights Commander of the Order of Merit of the Federal Republic of Germany